Kyle Nelson (born January 7, 1997) is an American soccer player who currently plays for Michigan Stars FC in the National Independent Soccer Association.

Career
Nelson played fours years of college soccer at Wofford College between 2015 and 2018, making 73 appearances, scoring 10 goals and tallying 1 assist. While at college, Nelson played for USL PDL side The Villages SC.

On March 7, 2019, Nelson signed for USL Championship side Charleston Battery.

On June 27, 2019, a fan club social media account was created in honor of Nelson. The Instagram account is called @KyleNelsonFC.

On July 9, 2022, just hours after signing to play for the Michigan Stars, Nelson scored his first professional goal, a game winning header in the 89th minute of play. In total, Kyle saw 10 appearances with the Michigan Stars in 2022 en route to the NISA championship. 

Internationally, Nelson is eligible to represent the United States through birth, as well as Canada and Jamaica through ancestry. 

He is the son of Canadian-Jamaican sprinter Karen Nelson, who represented Canada in the women's 100 metre hurdles at the 1984 Summer Olympic Games.

References

1997 births
Living people
American soccer players
Association football defenders
Charleston Battery players
Soccer players from Texas
USL Championship players
USL League Two players
The Villages SC players